

See also
 1960 in France
 1960 in French television

Notes

External links
 French films of 1960 at the Internet Movie Database
French films of 1960 at Cinema-francais.fr

1960
Films
Lists of 1960 films by country or language